Sevda-Cenap And Music Foundation (SCA) is a music  foundation in Turkey.

The foundation was established in 1973 in Ankara by Cevza and Cenap And. In addition to various projects, beginning by 1984 the foundation organizes the Ankara International Music Festival.

History
Cenap And (1894-1982) was a civil engineer. He was married to Sevda Tunalı (1902-1958). The couple established a winery named Kavaklıdere. Beginning by 1940 they were interested in music and they founded a club named Ses Tel Birliği (“Voice and String Union”) together with important musicians of the time like Adnan Saygun. After the death of her wife Sevda in 1958 due to a traffic accident,  Cenap And  married to Cevza Başman (1919-1988) in 1968. In 1973 they founded Sevda Cenap And Music Foundation. After Cenap And's death in 1982, Cevza continued as the president of the foundation. Cevza And died in 1988. Presently the president of the foundation is Avni Başman, Cevza Başman's brother.

References

Music organizations based in Turkey
Culture in Ankara
Foundations based in Turkey
Music in Ankara
1973 establishments in Turkey